Haven't I Told You (a translation of the original title is Neli Ti Rekov) is a Macedonian film that was produced in Yugoslavia in 1984. It is based on real events in Macedonia during the Ottoman era.
The plot revolves around a number of Macedonian revolutionaries battling against a large Ottoman-Turkish Army. The film can be seen with English subtitles.

References

External links
 

Macedonia under the Ottoman Empire
1984 films
Macedonian drama films
Films set in the 1900s